Borhanlu (also Romanized as Borhānlū) is a village in Baranduzchay-ye Shomali Rural District, in the Central District of Urmia County, West Azerbaijan Province, Iran. At the 2006 census, its population was 370, in 104 families.

References 

Populated places in Urmia County